The Sony Xperia XA series refers to a line of mid-range Android-based smartphones and phablets developed by Sony Corporation from 2016 to 2018 and is a branch of Sony Xperia X series. The original Sony Xperia XA was announced in Feb 2016 at MWC 2016 within the Sony Xperia X series.

All of devices in this line have IPS LCD displays, microSD card support, headphone jack, non-removable batteries and 64-bit octa-core processors and all except the Xperia XA and Xperia XA Ultra have the same 23MP main camera. Xperia XA is the only single-SIM device in this line. All of these devices except Xperia XA2 family have 1080p video recording cameras.

The original Xperia XA family 
These devices come with MT6755 Helio P10 chipset and 16GB of storage and have the same design language from Sony Xperia X and were launched with Android 6.0 Marshmallow and can be upgraded to Android 7.0 Nougat.

Xperia XA 
The Xperia XA has a 5.0" HD display, 13MP main camera and an 8MP selfie camera with 2GB of RAM. It won iF Design Award 2017 and Red Dot Award 2017.

Xperia XA Ultra 
The first phablet in the series announced in May 2016 and comes with a 6.0" Full-HD display, a 21MP main camera, a 16MP secondary camera and 3GB of RAM.

Xperia XA1 family 
These devices use newer design language named Loop Surface and have upgraded chipset namely MT6757 Helio P20 and are shipped with Android 7.0 Nougat with an update to Android 8.0 Oreo and are first devices in this line to have USB-type C. The Xperia XA1 and XA1 Ultra was announced in Feb 2017.

Xperia XA1 
The Xperia XA1 comes with the same display as Xperia XA, 32GB of storage, 3GB of RAM and 8 MP selfie camera.

Xperia XA1 Ultra 
With the same display as the Xperia XA Ultra, Xperia XA1 Ultra has 4 GB of RAM and 16MP selfie camera. It has two storage options including 32GB and 64GB.

Xperia XA1 Plus 
The Xperia XA1 Plus -announced in Aug 2017- has a 5.5" Full-HD display, 32GB of storage, 3/4GB of RAM and an 8 MP selfie camera. This is the first device in the Xperia XA line that has fingerprint sensor.

Xperia XA2 family 
Announced in Jan 2018, these devices have newer design and fingerprint sensor in rear and have upgraded chipset Snapdragon 630. All have shipped with Android 8.0 Oreo and are the first in this series that have 4K recording cameras. These are the first Sony Xperia devices that have rear-mounted fingerprint sensors instead of side-mounted ones.

Xperia XA2 
It has 5.2" Full-HD display, 32GB of internal storage, 3GB of RAM and 8MP selfie camera.

Xperia XA2 Ultra 
The latest phablet in the series comes with a 6" Full-HD display, 32/64GB of internal storage, 4GB of RAM and dual 16MP + 8MP selfie camera. This is the first Sony Xperia device that has dual cameras.

Xperia XA2 Plus
The Sony Xperia XA2 is a 6" phone with a 1080x1920p display. The Snapdragon 630 is paired with 3GB of RAM and 32GB of storage. The main camera is 23MP and the selfie camera is 8MP. The battery has a 3300mAh capacity.

References 

Sony mobile phones
Android (operating system) devices